Progresul is a district in southern Bucharest's Sectorul 4, Romania.

Reference 

Districts of Bucharest